Lake Shore Estates is an unincorporated community in Tarrant County, located in the U.S. state of Texas.

References

Unincorporated communities in Tarrant County, Texas
Unincorporated communities in Texas